Ivan Renar (26 April 1937 – 29 May 2022) was a member of the Senate of France, representing the Nord department. He was a member of the Communist, Republican, and Citizen Group.

References

External links
 Page on the Senate website

1937 births
2022 deaths
French Communist Party members
French Senators of the Fifth Republic
Senators of Nord (French department)
People from Roubaix